Mission Hills Haikou is a golf complex in Haikou, Hainan, China. Located around 10 km south of the center of Haikou, it comprises 10 golf courses, and at the north end, hotels including a Ritz Carlton and Renaissance, condominiums, a water park, and a Centreville (downtown) which includes numerous restaurants and shops. The site is 80 km2 (1.5 times the size of Manhattan) making it the second largest golf complex in the world. The largest is the Mission Hills Golf Club in Shenzhen.

History
Construction started in 2006 but stopped for several months during 2008 because of land disputes. As of 2018, the complex is nearly complete.

Events
The complex hosted the 2010 Mission Hills Star Trophy and the 2011 Omega Mission Hills World Cup.

The 2012 Mission Hills World Celebrity Pro-Am began was held in October 2012. The purse was US$1 million.

Other facilities

The complex has a movie theatre, a sports and recreation centre, tennis courts, and the Wet'n'Wild water park operated by Village Roadshow. There is also a natural mineral springs, a spa, and a shopping arcade.

See also
Mission Hills Golf Club

References

Golf clubs and courses in China
Sports venues in Hainan